The 1924 All-Pacific Coast Conference football team consists of American football players chosen by various organizations for All-Pacific Coast teams for the 1924 college football season.

All-Pacific Coast selections

Quarterback
Skippy Stivers, Idaho (UP-1)

Halfbacks
 Tut Imlay, California (UP-1)
 Wildcat Wilson, Washington (UP-1)

Fullback
 Elmer Tesreau, Washington (UP-1)

Ends
 Hobbs Adams, USC (UP-1)
 Jim Lawson, Stanford (UP-1)

Tackles
 Norman Anderson, USC (UP-1)
 Fay Thomas, USC (UP-1)

Guards
 Dana Carey, California (UP-1)
 Fred H. Swan, Stanford (UP-1)

Centers
 Edwin C. Horrell, California (UP-1)

Key
UP = United Press

See also
1924 College Football All-America Team

References

All-Pacific Coast Football Team
All-Pacific Coast football teams
All-Pac-12 Conference football teams